Stearns County is a county in the U.S. state of Minnesota. As of the 2020 census, the population was 158,292. Its county seat and largest city is St. Cloud. The county was founded in 1855. It was originally named for Isaac Ingalls Stevens, then renamed for Charles Thomas Stearns. Stearns County is part of the St. Cloud Metropolitan Statistical Area, which is also included in the Minneapolis-St. Paul Combined Statistical Area.

History
The Stearns County area was formerly occupied by numerous indigenous tribes, such as the Sioux (Dakota), Chippewa (Ojibwe) and Winnebago (Ho-chunk). The first large immigration was of German Catholics in the 1850s. Early arrivals also came from eastern states. The Wisconsin Territory was established by the federal government effective July 3, 1836, and existed until its eastern portion was granted statehood (as Wisconsin) in 1848. The federal government set up the Minnesota Territory effective March 3, 1849. The newly organized territorial legislature created nine counties across the territory in October of that year. The original counties had portions partitioned off in 1851 to create Cass County and in 1853 to create Sibley, Pierce, and Nicollet counties. In 1855 parts of those counties were partitioned off to create Stearns County. It was to be named Stevens County for territorial governor Isaac Ingalls Stevens, who had conducted an expedition through the area in 1853, but due to a clerical error, the county was named Stearns for Charles Thomas Stearns, a member of the Territorial Council. (To compensate for this error the area two counties west was later named Stevens County.) The February 20, 1855, act that created the county directed the naming of three county commissioners and specified St. Cloud as the county seat. The first courthouse was put into service on July 12, 1864, and it remained in use until the present courthouse was dedicated in 1922. In 1913 a campaign was mounted to shift the county seat to Albany, due to its more central location. The effort was not successful.

Geography

Stearns County borders nine counties. The Mississippi River flows southeast along its northeast border, and the Sauk River drains the central part of the county into the Mississippi at St. Cloud. The county terrain consists of low rolling hills, lightly wooded, dotted with lakes and ponds, and carved with drainages. All available area is devoted to agriculture or has been developed. The terrain slopes to the east and south, with its highest point a local protuberance at 7.6 miles (12.2 km) west and 1.6 mile (2.6 km) south of St. Joseph, at 1,461' (445m) ASL.

The northeastern border of Stearns County is formed by the Mississippi River. The land consists of rolling hills, scenic lakes, prairies, savannas and woodlands of a mixture of coniferous and deciduous trees. Stearns is one of 17 Minnesota savanna region counties with more savanna soils than either prairie or forest soils. The county has 166 lakes.

Major highways

  Interstate 94
  U.S. Highway 52
  U.S. Highway 71
  Minnesota State Highway 4
  Minnesota State Highway 15
  Minnesota State Highway 22
  Minnesota State Highway 23
  Minnesota State Highway 24
  Minnesota State Highway 28
  Minnesota State Highway 55
  Minnesota State Highway 237
  Minnesota State Highway 238
 List of county roads

Airports
Source:
 Brooten Municipal Airport (6D1) - east of Brooten
 Paynesville Municipal Airport (PEX) - west of Paynesville
 Sauk Centre Municipal Airport (D39) - south-southeast of Sauk Centre
 St. Cloud Regional Airport (STC) - east-southeast of St. Cloud

Adjacent counties

 Todd County - north
 Morrison County - northeast
 Benton County - northeast
 Sherburne County - east
 Wright County - southeast
 Meeker County - south
 Kandiyohi County - southwest
 Pope County - west
 Douglas County - northwest

Protected areas
Sources:

 Aron Hills Forest Scientific and Natural Area
 Birch Lakes State Forest
 Christopher Kurilla Wildlife Management Area
 Cold Spring Heron Colony Scientific and Natural Area
 Crow River Wildlife Management Area
 Edward Raymond Mohs Wildlife Management Area
 Follies Wildlife Management Area (part)
 Lake Koronis Regional Park
 Legacy Marsh Wildlife Management Area
 Miller Wildlife Management Area
 Milton Kjedahl Wildlife Management Area
 Norman T. Dahlman Wildlife Management Area
 Oxcart Crossing Wildlife Management Area
 Padua State Wildlife Management Area
 Patch Woods Scientific and Natural Area
 Quarry Park and Nature Preserve
 Quarry Park Scientific and Natural Area
 Rockville County Park and Nature Preserve
 Roscoe Prairie Scientific and Natural Area
 Saint Wendel Tamarack Bog Scientific and Natural Area
 Sauk River Wildlife Management Area
 Sedan Brook Prairie Scientific and Natural Area
 Stearns Prairie Heritage Wildlife Management Area
 Tamarack State Wildlife Management Area
 Tower State Wildlife Management Area
 Tribute Wildlife Management Area
 Victor Winder Wildlife Management Area
 Warner Lake County Park
 Zion State Wildlife Management Area

Demographics

2020 census

Note: the US Census treats Hispanic/Latino as an ethnic category. This table excludes Latinos from the racial categories and assigns them to a separate category. Hispanics/Latinos can be of any race.

2000 census

As of the 2000 United States census, there were 133,166 people, 47,604 households, and 32,132 families in the county. The population density was 99.2/sqmi (38.3/km2). There were 50,291 housing units at an average density of 37.4/sqmi (14.5/km2). The racial makeup of the county was 95.99% White, 0.83% Black or African American, 0.26% Native American, 1.58% Asian, 0.03% Pacific Islander, 0.47% from other races, and 0.82% from two or more races. 1.37% of the population were Hispanic or Latino of any race. 56.9% were of German and 9.4% Norwegian ancestry.

There were 47,604 households, out of which 35.00% had children under the age of 18 living with them, 56.30% were married couples living together, 7.50% had a female householder with no husband present, and 32.50% were non-families. 23.60% of all households were made up of individuals, and 8.40% had someone living alone who was 65 years of age or older. The average household size was 2.64 and the average family size was 3.15.

The county population contained 25.70% under the age of 18, 16.10% from 18 to 24, 28.00% from 25 to 44, 19.10% from 45 to 64, and 11.00% who were 65 years of age or older. The median age was 32 years. For every 100 females, there were 101.20 males. For every 100 females age 18 and over, there were 99.80 males.

The median income for a household in the county was $42,426, and the median income for a family was $51,553. Males had a median income of $34,268 versus $23,393 for females. The per capita income for the county was $19,211. About 4.30% of families and 8.70% of the population were below the poverty line, including 6.70% of those under age 18 and 8.60% of those age 65 or over.

Communities

Cities

 Albany
 Avon
 Belgrade
 Brooten (part)
 Clearwater (part)
 Cold Spring
 Eden Valley (part)
 Elrosa
 Freeport
 Greenwald
 Holdingford
 Kimball
 Lake Henry
 Meire Grove
 Melrose
 New Munich
 Paynesville
 Richmond
 Rockville
 Roscoe
 Saint Anthony
 Saint Augusta
 Saint Cloud (county seat; partial)
 Saint Joseph
 Saint Martin
 Saint Rosa
 Saint Stephen
 Sartell (part)
 Sauk Centre
 Spring Hill
 Waite Park

Census-designated place
 Fairhaven
 St. John's University

Unincorporated communities

 Collegeville
 Farming
 Five Points
 Georgeville
 Jacobs Prairie
 Marty
 Opole
 Padua
 Saint Anna
 Saint Francis
 Saint Nicholas
 Saint Wendel

Townships

 Albany Township
 Ashley Township
 Avon Township
 Brockway Township
 Collegeville Township
 Crow Lake Township
 Crow River Township
 Eden Lake Township
 Fair Haven Township
 Farming Township
 Getty Township
 Grove Township
 Holding Township
 Krain Township
 Lake George Township
 Lake Henry Township
 Le Sauk Township
 Luxemburg Township
 Lynden Township
 Maine Prairie Township
 Melrose Township
 Millwood Township
 Munson Township
 North Fork Township
 Oak Township
 Paynesville Township
 Raymond Township
 Saint Joseph Township
 Saint Martin Township
 Saint Wendel Township
 Sauk Centre Township
 Spring Hill Township
 Wakefield Township
 Zion Township

Politics and government
In its early history Stearns County was heavily Democratic due to being largely German Catholic and opposed to the pietistic Scandinavian Lutheran Republican Party of that era. It did not vote Republican until Theodore Roosevelt swept every Minnesota county in 1904. Anti-Woodrow Wilson feeling from World War I caused the county to shift overwhelmingly to Warren G. Harding in 1920 before swinging to Robert M. La Follette, coreligionist Al Smith and fellow “wet” Democrat Franklin D. Roosevelt.

In 1936 the county's isolationism gave strong support to William Lemke’s Union Party. Stearns County turned Republican until another Catholic nominee, John F. Kennedy, returned it to the Democratic ranks sufficiently to be one of only 130 counties nationwide to back George McGovern in 1972. Since the “Reagan Revolution”, Stearns County has voted reliably Republican, with no Democrat gaining a majority since Jimmy Carter in 1976, and Bill Clinton in 1996 the only one to manage a plurality. The county's growing social conservative bent has fueled the Republican trend.

In 2016 Donald Trump won the county with 59.8% of the vote, the highest percentage any presidential candidate has received since President Eisenhower in 1956. He improved on that in 2020 with 60.3% of the vote.

As of 2020, two cities in the county lean Democratic: St. Cloud, the largest city, and neighboring Waite Park.

See also
 Crow Lake (Stearns County, Minnesota)
 National Register of Historic Places listings in Stearns County, Minnesota

References

Further reading
 Mitchell, William Bell. History of Stearns County, Minnesota (2vols.) H.C. Cooper Jr., 1915. Online. Volume 1 and Volume 2
 Simpson, Lee M. A. Stearns County, Minnesota. Chicago: Arcadia Publishing, 2000. Print.  ,

External links
 Stearns County official website
 Sartell Historical Society - Sartell, MN
 Stearns History Museum official website

 
St. Cloud, Minnesota metropolitan area
Minnesota counties on the Mississippi River
1855 establishments in Minnesota Territory
Populated places established in 1855